Southwestern Bell Mobile Systems, Inc. was a wireless telephone company. It was created in 1984 as a split-off of Advanced Mobile Phone Service, the original wireless subsidiary of the Bell System. It was a division of Southwestern Bell Corporation.

It continued to operate as Southwestern Bell Mobile Systems until 2000, when SBC Communications and BellSouth combined their wireless operations into a single company, Cingular Wireless. Southwestern Bell Mobile Systems' assets were then transferred to a Cingular as a limited liability company named Cingular Southwestern Bell Mobile Systems, LLC. The company existed until 2006 when it was dissolved.

Southwestern Bell Mobile Systems' physical assets survive in what is now AT&T Mobility.

References

AT&T subsidiaries
Defunct mobile phone companies of the United States
Defunct telecommunications companies of the United States
American companies established in 1983
Telecommunications companies established in 1983 
Telecommunications  companies disestablished in 2006
American companies disestablished in 2006